The International Mathematical Modeling Challenge (IMMC or sometimes IM2C) is an international mathematical modeling competition for high school students in team mathematical modeling co-sponsored by COMAP and the NeoUnion ESC Organization. Teams are selected on a country-by-country basis, with each country sending its top two teams to the competition. The IMMC was inspired by the HiMCM, a similar contest sponsored by COMAP but mainly attracting teams within the United States. The HiMCM in turn was established in the 1990s to create a high school counterpart to COMAP’s MCM. Contestants in the IMMC are given five days to research (the contest permits the use of any inanimate source) and write a mathematical paper detailing their mathematical model for a given situation. At the conclusion of the five-day period, papers are sent to an international expert committee composed of mathematics faculty from the world’s leading universities. Traditionally, 3-4 teams are awarded the top designation of Outstanding and invited to an awards ceremony, held in a different country each year.

Team selection
Each participating country is expected to choose its two best teams of four contestants each to compete in the IMMC. Globally, different methods have been used to select teams from their respective countries.

Hong Kong holds the contest early and allows any interested team to participate. A national judging panel selects the two best papers to move on to the international round of the competition. In 2015, 60 papers came out of the Greater China region alone.

In 2015, the United States used a different qualification process, inviting the top two teams from the 2014 HiMCM to compete in the IMMC. In 2016, the United States adopted a hybrid of Hong Kong’s approach and its own former approach: any team receiving a score of Meritorious or higher in the 2015 HiMCM (roughly 25% of competing teams) was invited to compete in the 2016 IMMC. As in Hong Kong, the United States held the IMMC early, completed a national round of judging, and selected the two best papers to move on to the international round.

Most countries use a selection process similar to that used by Hong Kong, and countries entering the IMMC for the first time will also likely adopt a similar process.

Judging

Papers passing the national selection round move on to the international expert judging panel. In 2015, the Expert Panel included:

 Dr. Frank Giordano, Naval Postgraduate School, USA, former Head of the Department of Mathematics at West Point Military Academy (Chair)
 Dr. Konstantin K. Avilov, Institute for Numerical Mathematics, Russia
 Dr. Ruud Stolwijk, Cito, The Netherlands
 Dr. Yongji Tan, Fudan University, China

Results

2015
17 teams from the following countries competed in the 2015 IMMC:

 Belgium
 Hong Kong SAR
 Macau SAR
 People's Republic of China
 Russia
 Singapore
 Slovakia
 Thailand
 The Netherlands
 United States of America

Of these teams, four were awarded the top designation of International Outstanding and invited to the awards ceremony in Hong Kong:

Palo Alto High School, Palo Alto, CA, USA
 Advisor, Radu Toma
 Eric Foster
 Kathryn Li
 Allison Zhang
 Andrew Lee

The Affiliated High School of Peking University, Beijing, China
 Advisor, Yaoyang Wang
 Donghan Wang
 Haimei Zhang
 Wanchun Shen
 Dingding Dong

Raffles Girls' School (Secondary), Singapore
 Advisor, Samuel Lee
 Siah Kelly
 Wang Huaijin
 Li Anqi
 Lee Estelle

Shanghai Nanyang Model School, Shanghai, China
 Advisor, Gao Junxiang
 Cai Yiyi
 Chen Zhihao
 Xiao Zhijun
 Yan Yijia

Seven were awarded the Meritorious designation:

 Clover Hill High School, USA
 National Junior College, Singapore
 Sint-Jozefscollege Turnhout, Belgium
 MSU, Russia
 Diocesan Girls' School, Hong Kong
 Yuen Long Public Secondary School, Hong Kong
 Utrechts Stedelijk Gymnasium, The Netherlands

Four were awarded the Honorable Mention designation:

 Mahidol Wittayanusorn School, Thailand
 IGiL SB RAS, Russia
 Pui Ching Middle School, Macau
 Gymnazium Alejova 1, Slovakia

Two were awarded the Successful Participant designation:

 PENTA College CSG, The Netherlands
 Gymnazium Postova 9, Slovakia

2016
40 teams from the following 23 countries or regions competed in the 2016 IMMC:
 Australia
 Belgium
 Bulgaria
 Canada
 Chile
 People's Republic of China
 Germany
 Hong Kong
 Japan
 Macau
 Malaysia
 Mexico
 The Netherlands
 New Zealand
 Philippines
 Russia
 Singapore
 Slovakia
 South Korea
 Taiwan
 Thailand
 United Kingdom
 United States of America

Of these teams, three were awarded the top designation of International Outstanding and invited to the awards ceremony at the International Congress on Mathematics Education in Hamburg, Germany:

Palo Alto High School, Palo Alto, CA, USA
 Advisor, Radu Toma
 Eric Foster
 Kathryn Li
 Allison Zhang
 Andrew Lee

Diocesan Girls' School, Kowloon, Hong Kong (SAR)
 Advisor, Yeung Po Ki
 Cheng Wai Chung
 Liang Hui Lin
 Poon Ho Kiu Allie
 Jia Jimsyn

Pui Ching Middle School, Kowloon, Hong Kong (SAR)
 Advisor, Lee Ho Fung
 Wong Tsz Chun
 Ling Janice
 Ngai Chi Ki
 Lynn Shung Hei

Fourteen were awarded the Meritorious designation:
 Chesterfield County Math/Science High School at Clover Hill, Midlothian, Virginia, USA
 Trinity College, East Perth, Western Australia, Australia
 National Junior College, Singapore
 Perth Modern School, Subiaco, Western Australia, Australia
 Staatliches Heinrich-Heine-Gymnasium, Kaiserslautern, Rheinland-Pfalz, Germany
 Hermann Wesselink College, Amstelveen, The Netherlands
 Gymnazium Postova 9, Kosice, Slovakia
 KVIS Science Academy, Rayong, Thailand
 Raffles Girls' School (Secondary), Singapore
 Pui Ching Middle School, Macau (SAR)
 Kaohsiung Municipal Senior High School, Kaohsiung, Taiwan
 Gyeonggi Science High School for the Gifted, Suwon, South Korea
 Whangarei Boys High School, Northland, New Zealand
 Seoul Science High School, Seoul, South Korea

Nine were awarded the Honorable Mention designation:
 Sint-Jozef College, Turnhout, Belgium
 Shanghai Experimental School, Shanghai, China
 Mahidol Wittayanusorn School, Nakornpatom, Thailand
 Sacred Heart Canossian College, Macau (SAR)
 College Nassau-Veluwe, Harderwijk, The Netherlands
 Holy Cross College, Bury, Lancashire, United Kingdom
 Nin Hua High School Klang, Selangor, Malaysia
 Tainan Tzu Chi Senior High School, Tainan, Taiwan
 Gymnazium, Alejova 1, Kosice, Slovakia

Fourteen were awarded the Successful Participant designation:
 Lavrentyev Institute of Hydrodynamics, Novosibirsk, Russia
 Beijing National Day School, Beijing, People's Republic of China
 OLVV Lowerdes College, Edegen, Belgium
 Moscow State University, Moscow, Russia
 Philippine Science High School, Metro Manila, Philippines (x2)
 Kanazawa University Senior High School, Ishikawa, Japan (x2)
 First English Language School, Sofia, Bulgaria
 Liceo Eduardo De La Barra, Valparaiso, Chile
 Senator O'Connor College School, North York, Ontario, Canada
 Tecnológico de Monterrey, Campus E., Nuevo León, México (x2)
 Gymnasium Westerburg, Rheinland-Pfalz, Germany

2017
49 teams from the following 27 countries/regions competed in the 2017 IMMC: 
 Argentina
 Australia
 Canada
 China
 Denmark
 Germany
 Hong Kong (SAR)
 Israel
 Japan
 Macau (SAR)
 Malaysia
 Mexico
 New Zealand
 Papua New Guinea
 Philippines
 Poland
 Portugal
 Russia
 Singapore
 Slovakia
 South Korea
 Taiwan
 Thailand
 The Netherlands
 Turkey
 United States of America
 US Virgin Islands

Of these teams, one was awarded the top designation of International Outstanding and invited to the awards ceremony at the Harvard University, Cambridge MA., USA along with three randomly selected Meritorious teams from Argentina, South Korea and Russia.

NC School of Science and Mathematics, NC, USA
 Advisor, Daniel Teague
 Ahmad Askar
 Nikhil Milind
 Nikhil Reddy
 Sreeram Venkat

Seven were awarded the Meritorious designation:
 Gyeonggi Science High School for the Gifted, Suwon, Gyeonggi, South Korea
 Capital High School, Helena, MT, USA
 St Paul's Co-educational College, Hong Kong, Hong Kong (SAR)
 Staatliches Heinrich-Heine-Gymnasium, Kaiserslautern, Rheinland-Pfalz, Germany
 St Andrew's Scots School, Buenos Aires, BA, Argentina
 St Stephen's College, Hong Kong, Hong Kong (SAR)
 School 179 of Moscow Institute of Open Education, Moscow, Russia

Twenty-seven were awarded the Honorable Mention designation:
 Konrad-Adenauer-Gymnasium Westerburg, Westerburg, Germany
 Beijing National Day School, Beijing, China
 Perth Modern School, Subiaco, WA, Australia
 AY Jackson Secondary School, Toronto, ON, Canada
 Sacred Heart Canossian College, Macau, Macau (SAR)
 Ukarumpa International School (1), Ukarumpa, EHP, Papua New Guinea
 Utrechts Stedelijk Gymnasium (1), Utrecht, The Netherlands
 II Liceum Ogólnokształcące z Oddziałami (1), Warszawa, Mazowieckie, Poland
 SMJK Katholik Petaling Jaya, Petaling Jaya, Selangor, Malaysia
 Whangarei Boys High School, Whangarei, New Zealand
 Philippine Science High School - Main Campus (1), Quezon City, Philippines
 Jerusalem College of Technology, Jerusalem, Israel
 Kaohsiung Municipal Kaohsiung Senior High School, Kaohsiung City, Taiwan
 John Monash Science School, Clayton, VIC, Australia
 Pui Ching Middle School, Macau, Macau (SAR)
 Moscow State University, Moscow, Russia
 II Liceum Ogólnokształcące z Oddziałami (2), Warszawa, Mazowieckie, Poland
 Shanghai Jianping High School, Shanghai, China
 Kanazawa University Senior High School (1), Kanazawa, Ishikawa, Japan
 North London Collegiate School Jeju, Seogwipo, Jeju Island, South Korea
 H.C. Orsteds Gymnasiet (1), Kgs. Lyngby, Denmark
 Utrechts Stedelijk Gymnasium (2), Utrecht, The Netherlands
 Madeans College, Bucklands Beach, Auckland, New Zealand
 Taichung Girls' Senior High School, Taichung City, Taiwan
 Raffles Girls' School, Singapore
 Gymnazium Postova 9, Kosice, Slovakia
 Kanazawa University Senior High School (2), Kanazawa, Ishikawa, Japan

Fourteen were awarded the Successful Participant designation:
 H.C. Orsteds Gymnasiet (2), Kgs. Lyngby, Denmark
 Tecnologico de Monterrey, Monterrey, Nuevo Leon, Mexico
 Ukarumpa International School (2), Ukarumpa, EHP, Papua New Guinea
 Uygarlik ve Bilgi Okulu, Izmir, Turkey
 Gymnazium Paula Horova, Slovakia
 St. Croix Central High School (1), Christiansted, VI, US Virgin Islands
 St. John Paul II Catholic Secondary School, Scarborough, ON, Canada
 Secondary School of Valongo, Valongo, Portugal
 Philippine Science High School - Main Campus (2), Quezon City, Philippines
 Kamnoetvidya Science Academy School, Rayong, Thailand (x2)
 Jurong Junior College, Singapore
 St. Croix Central High School (2), Christiansted, VI, US Virgin Islands
 Eyuboglu College, Istanbul, Umraniye, Turkey

Awards ceremony

The 2015 IMMC winning teams from the USA, Singapore, and China were brought to Hong Kong for the IMMC Award Presentation Ceremony on 5 July 2015 at Hong Kong University, sponsored by Guangdong Qtone Education Co., Knowledge Magazine, Hong Kong Federation of Education Workers, Competition on System Modeling & Optimization (COSMO), CUHK, HKACE, and the Hong Kong Entrepreneurs and Executives Club.

Special guests included Hong Kong political leader the Honorable Mrs. Fanny Law and movie directors Mr Tsui Siu-Ming and Mr Tang Yat-Ming. Professor Frederick Leung, Chairman of the Board of Faculty, Faculty of Education, University of Hong Kong, gave the opening speech. Law encouraged educators in Hong Kong and elsewhere to continue to pursue the type of educational innovation promoted by the IMMC. Given that the 2015 problem revolved around mathematically modeling a movie filming production schedule, directors Tsui and Tang discussed their own experiences in the movie industry and how applicable teams’ models were to real-world movie filming decisionmaking.

The 2016 IMMC winning teams from the USA and Hong Kong, in addition to the Meritorious German team, were brought to Hamburg, Germany for the IMMC Award Ceremony on 26 July 2016 at the University of Hamburg as part of the quadrennial International Congress on Mathematical Education. Dr. Sol Garfunkel described how the contest has evolved and discussed plans for the future.

Media coverage

The IMMC has received broad press coverage throughout the world, with the majority of coverage concentrated in the U.S. and Greater China. The IMMC has been featured by:

Apple Daily
China News Review (CRNTT)
Commercial Radio Hong Kong (人民大道中)
DBC Radio
Hong Kong Commercial Daily
Hong Kong Economic Journal
KRON 4 Television
KTSF Television
Metro Daily
Ming Pao
On.CC
Oriental Daily News
Palo Alto Daily Post
Palo Alto Weekly
San Jose Mercury News
Shumo
Sing Tao Daily
Sky Post
Ta Kung Pao
The Sun
Wen Wei Po
Wo Ke Ji

Leadership
The IMMC is overseen by an international Organizing Committee of the following people:

 Solomon Garfunkel, COMAP, USA – Chair
 Keng Cheng Ang, National Institute of Education, Singapore
 Fengshan Bai, Deputy Dean of Faculty of Science, Tsinghua University, China
 Alfred Cheung, NeoUnion ESC Organization, Hong Kong SAR
 Frederick Leung, The University of Hong Kong, Hong Kong SAR
 Vladimir Dubrovsky, Moscow State University, Russia
 Henk van der Kooij, Freudenthal Institute, The Netherlands
 Zbigniew Marciniak, Warsaw University, Poland
 Mogens Allan Niss, Roskilde University, Denmark
 Ross Turner, Australian Council for Educational Research, Australia

Advisory/Academic Committee for IMMC in Greater China:

 Professor Kam Fai Wong, Deputy Dean of Faculty of Engineering, Chinese University of Hong Kong
 Professor Tong Yang, Head of Department of Mathematics, City University of Hong Kong
 Professor Wai Ki Ching, Head of Department of Mathematics, University of Hong Kong
 Professor Guanhua Chen, Head of Department of Chemistry, University of Hong Kong
 Professor Houmin Yan, Dean of College of Business, City University of Hong Kong
 Professor Hong Yan, Department of Logistics and Maritime Studies, Hong Kong Polytechnic University
 Professor Fiona Yan Liu, Director of Cognitive Computing Lab, Hong Kong Polytechnic University
 Professor Michael Ng, Head of Department of Mathematics, Hong Kong Baptist University
 Dr. Simon Hoey Lee, Deputy Secretary-General, Our Hong Kong Foundation
 Mr. Terry K.W. Li, Associate Director, Sun Hung Kai Properties-Kwoks’ Foundation Ltd.

Expert Panel for IMMC in Greater China:

 Professor Wai Ki Ching, the University of Hong Kong - Chair
 Mr. James Hung, Hong Kong International Mathematics Olympiad – Convener
 Professor Kam Fai Wong, Chinese University of Hong Kong
 Professor Jinxing Xie, Tsinghua University and China Undergraduate Mathematical Contest in Modeling (CUMCM)
 Dr. Zhonghua Qiao, Hong Kong Polytechnic University
 Dr. Tuen Wai Ng, University of Hong Kong
 Dr. Junhui Wang, City University of Hong Kong
 Professor Chi-Kong (Kevin) Ng, Chinese University of Hong Kong
 Dr. Simon To, Hong Kong Baptist University

Future contests

The 2017 IMMC contest period will end on May 8, 2017 (national rounds within certain countries will end earlier). Results will be announced in June, and teams awarded the Outstanding designation will be honored.

References

External links 
 How to Fix Our Math Education by Sol Garfunkel, founder of IMMC

Mathematics competitions